Thriller 25: Limited Japanese Single Collection was a 25th anniversary limited Japanese edition box set released in 2008 for the American singer and recording artist Michael Jackson's sixth studio album Thriller. The original album sold more than 70 million copies worldwide, making it the world's best selling album of all time.

Contents
The limited-edition box-set contains a 14-track set of all seven CD singles that were released, with two tracks on each CD plus each disc having B-sides, the A-side being the main single taken from the Thriller album. Each CD is housed in a mini-LP replica cardboard sleeve with the original artwork including Sony inner sleeves and "vinyl look" discs, with the set housed in a glossy 5" picture box with a Japanese and English lyric booklet and gold "King Of Pop" obi strip).

Track listing

Personnel 

 Brian Banks – keyboards, synthesizers, programming
 Michael Boddicker – keyboards, synthesizers
 N'dugu Chancler – drums
 Paulinho da Costa – percussion
 David Foster – keyboards, synthesizers
 Gary Grant – trumpet and flügelhorn
 Eddie Van Halen – guitar solo on "Beat It"
 Jerry Hey – trumpet and flügelhorn
 Michael Jackson – co-producer, lead and background vocals, drum case beater, bathroom stomp board, vocal, drum, horn, and string arrangement
 Paul Jackson – guitar
 Louis Johnson – bass guitar
 Quincy Jones – producer
 Steve Lukather – guitar, bass guitar
 Anthony Marinelli – synthesizer programming
 Paul McCartney – vocals on "The Girl Is Mine"
 David Paich – keyboards, synthesizers, programming
 Dean Parks – guitar
 Greg Phillinganes – keyboards, synthesizers, programming
 Jeff Porcaro – drums, horn, and string arrangements
 Steve Porcaro – keyboards, synthesizers, programming
 Vincent Price – voice-over on "Thriller"
 Bill Reichenbach – trombone
 Bruce Swedien – recording engineer, mixer
 Chris Shepard  – vibraslap on "Beat It"
 Rod Temperton – keyboards, synthesizers
 David Williams – guitar
 Larry Williams – saxophone and flute
 Bill Wolfer – keyboards, synthesizers
 La Toya Jackson – background vocals on "PYT"
 Janet Jackson – background vocals on "PYT"
 Greg Smith – synthesizers

See also
 Thriller 25
 Michael Jackson albums discography

References

2008 compilation albums
Michael Jackson compilation albums
Albums produced by Michael Jackson
Albums produced by Quincy Jones
B-side compilation albums
Epic Records compilation albums
Reissue albums